Haulie may refer to:

 nickname of Michael Haulie Daly (1922–1991), Irish hurler
 nickname of Micheál O'Sullivan (born 1977), Irish retired Gaelic footballer
 Haulie McKee, an accordion player in The Tulla Céilí Band
 Haulie, Chuck's mother in the television series The Adventures of Chuck and Friends

Lists of people by nickname